Companhia das Letras is the largest publishing house in São Paulo, Brazil. It was founded by Luiz Schwarcz and his wife Lilia Moritz Schwarcz in 1986. Companhia das Letras began as a literary publishing house and gradually grew into 17 independent publishing units with a broad readership of all ages and industries.

History
 
According to an interview with The Guardian, Luiz was aware of a lack of quality publishing houses in Brazil after eight years in the publishing industry, and in 1986, recognizing the opportunity, Luiz and his wife established a publishing house that combined literary, commercial and good marketing techniques. Over the next 30 years, Luiz's publishing career went surprisingly well (Caiaty, 2019). Their first book was Edmund Wilson's To the Finland Station, which had never been published in Brazil, even though it had been out for almost 40 years at the time. The book even sold more copies than it did in the United States. As a result, the publisher quickly gained a good reputation in the country and signed a heavyweight Brazilian contemporary writer, Rubem Fonseca. Since then, the publishing house has been building and growing (Baensch, 2006).

In December 2011, Penguin gained 45 per cent of its market share and merged with Random House shortly and increased its stake to 70 per cent. Hence, the Schwarcz family has occupied 30 per cent of the publisher. This action allowed Companhia das Letras to expand its publishing genres and create more brands, becoming part of the publishing house in the world. "It gave us great learning opportunities and the ability to share their experience with fellow publishers worldwide", said Luiz Schwarcz (Caiaty, 2019).

In 2015, Nielsen BookScan stated that "Companhia das Letras is the second largest book publisher with an 8.08% market share in Brazil". In 2017, BookScan updated Companhia das Letras as "the largest book publisher with over 5,000 titles and 34 Nobel Prize winners" (Baensch, 2006).

In addition, its publisher, Luiz Schwarcs, received the London Book Fair's 2017 Lifetime Achievement Award. David Roche, a member of the London Book Fair Advisory Group, commented: "Luiz is one of the world's leading publishers, and his name could be said to represent the Brazilian publishing industry" (Caiaty, 2019).

Meanwhile, "the publishing house has earned respect in the industry over the years for its high-quality fiction, nonfiction and scientific publications" (Ban, 2015).

Some of the published titles

From its inception, literature and social sciences have been the main areas of Companhia das Letras, spanning several subgenres: foreign language and original fiction, poetry, detective and thriller novels, literary criticism, historical works, political science, anthropology, philosophy and psychology; now they also publish the photograph, cooking, science fiction, biology, memoirs, travel literature, and so on.

"The publisher produces a wide range of books, from the Bible to young adult literature, novels, biographies and comics" (Dolhnikoff, 2012). According to the publisher's 2015 survey on the favourite books and authors of all age groups, foreign works are among the most popular, but more than half of them still come from Brazil (Dolhnikoff, 2012). Furthermore, the publisher created two new sub-brands to differentiate commercial books and purely literary works. Paralela, a commercial book brand, and Seguinte, a young adult book brand.

The list of the publisher's authors includes 12 Nobel Prize-winning writers, including the famous American poet Elizabeth Bishop, the American experimental psychologist Steven Pinker, Nobel laureate Doris Lessing, and José Saramago. Steven Pinker, Nobel Laureate Doris Lessing, José Saramago, and 12 other Nobel Prize writers. In Asia, we have published authors such as Junichiro Tanizaki and Haruki Murakami.

Some of the authors in the catalog

Jorge Luis Borges (Argentina)
Jorge Amado (Brazil)
José Saramago (Portugal)
Vinicius de Moraes (Brazil)
Chico Buarque (Brazilian singer)
Machado de Assis (Brazil)
Luis Verissimo (Brazil)
Harold Bloom (USA)
Philip Roth (USA)
Feodor Dostoevsky (Russia)
Roberto Bolaño (Chile - Spain)
Dr. Seuss (United States)
Caetano Veloso (Brazilian singer)
Alejo Carpentier (Cuba, creator of magical realism)
Dav Pilkey (USA; was signed to Cosac Naify before 2015, when that publisher closed)
William Steig (USA)
Shel Silverstein (USA)
Jostein Gaarder (Norway)

Crisis

Brazil is the largest country in South America in terms of area and population. As a country of immigrants, its culture is a fusion of Indian, European, African and Asian cultures and is characterised by diversity and openness, which provides rich resources and a huge market for the development of the cultural industry (Fausto et al., 2014).

In the ten years between 1995 and 2005, the Brazilian publishing industry went through a process of decline: book sales fell by nearly 23% cumulatively, with an average annual decline of 2.7%. According to a survey by the Brazilian Publishing Association, only 1/3 of the educated population reads more than one book a year, and adult readers account for only 33% of all adults. However, introducing a series of government stimulus policies, from 2006 onwards, the Brazilian publishing industry gradually out of the trough, ushering in recovery and growth (Costa, 2011).

On October 30, 2004, Brazil enacted its first federal book law. It is an essential milestone in the development of the publishing industry in Brazil, as books are recognised by law as an "irreplaceable medium for the dissemination of culture and the transmission of knowledge". On December 22, 2004, the government legislated a complete tax exemption for book publishing (Baensch, 2006).

After announcing the closure of 20 bookstores in October 2018, Brazil's largest bookstore chain, Saraiva, announced late last month that it was filing for bankruptcy protection due to debts totalling more than $160 million. Cultura, another major bookstore chain, also announced a restructuring plan this fall to avoid bankruptcy, and together they have more than 100 bookstores in Brazil, accounting for 40 per cent of the country's bookselling market.

The downturn in the book market has affected publishers in the upper reaches of the industry. In August, Editora Abril, one of Brazil's largest publishing houses, announced a massive layoff plan, with 10 of its magazines ceasing publication and some 550 employees, including some 150 journalists, being laid off. Writers' lives have also been affected (Varão,2021).

In his personal blog, Cartas de Amor aos livros (Love Letters to Books), Luiz Schwarcz, wrote: "It's impossible to predict how big the impact of this crisis will be, but it's frightening enough ...... Many towns will not have a single bookstore left, and publishers are now facing the challenge of getting their books to consumers and having to deal with losses that have accumulated over time" (Ban, 2015).

The difficult situation for bookstores and publishers is not a new problem. Earlier this year, a survey done by the Brazilian Book Council showed that the Brazilian publishing market has continued to shrink over the past three years, having fallen by a cumulative 22 per cent since 2015. Between 2016 and 2017, book sales fell by 30 million copies.

In response to the immediate crisis, Schwartz said he has fired six employees and said it was "one of the most painful moments in his personal and professional life. Schwartz's company has been trying innovative alternatives to overcome the current crisis. They have launched a phone and mail service called "Socorro, Companhia" to make it easier for readers to find books; in addition, the company has set up a sales team to provide door-to-door service. For instance, calling on other publishers, booksellers and authors to join Com in "finding creative and idealistic solutions" (Ban, 2015).

"If you share my passion for books, I hope you will respond and share my call to urge others to pick up a few books this holiday season. Whether it's a work by your favourite author or a new one you've always wanted to try," Schwartz writes in the article, "there are bookstores that have persevered in the face of adversity, and you can go there to pay tribute to them in a tangible way, or to help those that have fallen on hard times. Most importantly, there are many small, obscure publishers who desperately need your support to deal with this existential crisis" (Amaral,2000).

In response to Schwartz's call, the hashtag "DêLivrosDePresente" (which means "books are gifts") quickly spread on Brazilian social media. Schwartz told Publishing Perspectives that he found the response generous and surprising but also said, "Unfortunately, current politics is always about creating divided groups, and people are always against things rather than accepting them. So I try to create a good community, a loving community, or a community that loves books" (Ban, 2015).

Companhia das Letras has launched a service to help consumers track book information via cell phone and email and has built a home delivery sales team.

Schwarcz's blog, which has received an overwhelming response on Brazilian social media, urges people to buy more books during the Christmas season to help bookstores weather the crisis (Mcmanus, 2020).

Opportunity- Uses Smart Keyword Placement to Discover the Next Great Engaging Book

Brazil-based publisher Companhia das Letras has been an active seller since Amazon.com.br first entered the Brazilian market in 2012. In the same pioneering spirit, they were also an early adopter of Amazon's self-service advertising product immediately after the solution was first launched in Brazil in December 2020.

Currently, the brand invests approximately 30% of its advertising budget in Amazon advertising. To diversify its marketing mix and help further increase product awareness, Companhia das Letras' advertising budget is spread across multiple channels, such as natural and paid search, social media, physical bookstores, email marketing and e-newsletters.

As one of the first sellers in Brazil to use Amazon advertising, the company had no prior experience with the solution. But from explaining webinars to online video tutorials, Companhia das Letras has used Amazon Advertising's online resources to improve its campaigns and identify critical business dates, using a solid strategy to be well prepared. With the support of Amazon Advertising, the publisher had an impressive first quarter. Companhia das Letras' familiarity with advertising solutions helped them diversify their campaign strategies and use on-demand advertising analytics for ongoing optimization. This strategic campaign management has resulted in an advertising input-to-output ratio (ACOS)1 of about 20%, a figure the publisher calls "quite satisfactory ” (Mcmanus, 2020).

Overall, collaboration through Amazon Ad Execution has helped achieve the following goals.

- Companhia das Letras achieved triple-digit growth in early 2021.2

- The ripple effect of success observed outside of Amazon, combined with the now successful advertising campaign, also helped increase sales in the physical bookstore.

- Since December 2020, there have been more than 19,000 new exclusive customers.

"Amazon advertising has enabled us to reach a wider audience. In addition, it has allowed us to run both merchandising and branding campaigns." Castro says.
By exploring different techniques and experimenting with alternative budgets, our ability to test and learn has helped our valued readers find their ideal book (West, 2022).

--Kyara Castro, Marketing Analyst, Companhia das Letras

Luiz Schwarcz, founder of Companhia das Letras, has felt the tremendous changes in the global publishing world over the last thirty years and "the world to see Brazilian writers (Amaral, 2000). Nowadays, the demand for reading is growing all over the world, and copyright deals play a crucial role in bridging cultures. As Luiz says: "We are using new ways to tell people that reading is a precious blanket to help them escape the hustle and bustle of the world.

Recent cultural activities

Most recently, com has been working on a campaign called “Books are immigrants” which is closely tied to current events in society. For Com, which is a publisher of almost foreign books. “It is a way to emphasize their appreciation and support of cultural exchange, and their hope that the exchange of cultures will become more frequent and of higher quality in Brazil” (Bispo, 2008). It has successfully continued this activity until now and retains its original beginnings.

References

 Amaral, R. C. (2000). José Bonifácio de Andrada e Silva: the greatest man in Brazilian History. Xlibris Corporation.

 Baensch, R. E. (2006). The book publishing industry in Brazil. Publishing research quarterly, 22(4), 31.

 Bispo, T. (2008). The market for publishers in Brazil. Publishing research quarterly, 24(3), 178-186.

 Ban, A. (2015). Brazilian Books for Export. Publishing Research Quarterly, 31(4), 282-297.

 Costa, R. (2011). A Review of the Brazilian Book Market.Publishing research quarterly, 27(1), 72-75.

 Carrenho, C. (2015). Brazil: Has the Country of the Future Become the Country of the Present for Book Publishing?. Publishing Research Quarterly, 31(1), 54-63.

 Cajaty, P. (2019). The Challenges and Developments of Book Publishing in Brazil. Publishing Research Quarterly, 35(1), 1-5.

 Corrêa Da Silva, I. (2015). Recensão do livro José Bonifácio. O patriarca vencido, de Miriam

 Dolhnikoff, São Paulo: Companhia das Letras, 2012. E-Journal of Portugueses History, 3, 125-131.

 Dolhnikoff, M. São Paulo: Companhia das Letras, 2012. .

 De Holanda, S. B. (2012). Roots of Brazil. University of Notre Dame Pess.

 e Castro, P. M. (2019). Graciliano Ramos and the Making of Modern Brazil: Memories, Politics and Identities by Sara Brandellero Lúcia Villares. Portuguese Studies, 35(1), 106-107.

 Fausto, B., & Fausto, S. (2014). A concise history of Brazil. Cambridge University Press.

 Hallewell, L. (1982). Books in Brazil: a history of the publishing trade. Scarecrow Press. Meade, T. A. (2010). A brief history of Brazil. Infobase Publishing.

 Mcmanus, C. M., Neves, A. A. B., & Maranhao, A. Q. (2020). Brazilian publication profiles: Where and how Brazilian authors publish. Anais da Academia Brasileira de Ciências, 92.

 Outtes, J. (2001). Cortiços e epidemias na Corte Imperial, São Paulo. SIDNEY CHALHOUB: Companhia das Letras, 1996.

 Pimenta, J. P. G. (2009). The Independence of Brazil: a review of the recent historiographic production. E-journal of Portuguese History, 7(1), 6.

 Vieira, T. A., & Mager, G. B. (2014). The graphic designer as author/actor in the production of books: the acts of Companhia das Letras and Cosac Naify at'Toda
Poesia'and'Vermelho Amargo'/O designer grafico como a (u) tor na producao de livros: os atos de Companhia das Letras e Cosac Naify em Toda Poesia e Vermelho 
Amargo. CROMA, (4), 117-125.

 Soleil, C. G. Companhia das Letras.

 Sehn, T. C. M., & Fragoso, S. (2015). The synergy between eBooks and printed books in Brazil. Online Information Review.

 West, E. (2022). Buy Now: How Amazon Branded Convenience and Normalized Monopoly. MIT Press.

 Varão, R. (2021). Patrícia Campos Mello (2020), The Hate Machine: notes from a reporter on fake news and digital violence [A máquina do ódio: notas de uma repórter sobre fake news e violência digital]. São Paulo: Companhia das Letras. Language: Portuguese Brazilian. . Pbk, 296 pages.

External links
Official site (in Portuguese)
Official blog (in Portuguese)

Book publishing companies of Brazil
1986 establishments in Brazil
Publishing companies established in 1986
Penguin Random House